In enzymology, an aminoglycoside N6'-acetyltransferase is an enzyme that catalyzes the chemical reaction

acetyl-CoA + kanamycin-B  CoA + N6'-acetylkanamycin-B

Thus, the two substrates of this enzyme are acetyl-CoA and kanamycin B, whereas its two products are CoA and N6'-acetylkanamycin-B.

This enzyme belongs to the family of transferases, specifically those acyltransferases transferring groups other than aminoacyl groups.  The systematic name of this enzyme class is acetyl-CoA:kanamycin-B N6'-acetyltransferase. Other names in common use include aminoglycoside 6'-N-acetyltransferase, aminoglycoside-6'-acetyltransferase, aminoglycoside-6-N-acetyltransferase, and kanamycin acetyltransferase.

Structural studies

References

 
 
 

EC 2.3.1
Enzymes of known structure